Fahad Khan (born 25 November 1983) is a Pakistani cricketer. He played in 32 first-class and 15 List A matches between 2003 and 2009. Khan made his Twenty20 debut on 25 April 2005, for Karachi Dolphins in the 2004–05 National Twenty20 Cup.

References

External links
 

1983 births
Living people
Pakistani cricketers
Karachi Dolphins cricketers
Karachi Port Trust cricketers
Karachi Whites cricketers
Sindh cricketers
Place of birth missing (living people)